Marichal is a Spanish surname originating in the 16th century. Notable people with the surname include:

 Juan Marichal (born 1937), Dominican baseball player
 Kalimba Marichal (born 1982), Mexican singer and actor
 Edmundo Marichal, Chilean aviation pioneer
 Poli Marichal, Puerto Rican artist
 Nicolás Marichal, Uruguayan football player

Spanish-language surnames